Season 4 may refer to:

"Season 4" (30 Rock episode), an episode of 30 Rock

See also

 Season One (disambiguation)
 Season 2 (disambiguation)